Muncaster Mountain is a  mountain summit located within Olympic National Park in Jefferson County of Washington state. Precipitation runoff from the mountain drains into Rustler Creek, which is a tributary of the Quinault River. Although modest in elevation, relief is significant as the summit rises 4,000 feet above the Rustler Creek valley in one mile.

History
The 1889–1890 Seattle Press Expedition originally named this geographical feature "Mount DeYoung", for M. H. de Young of the San Francisco Chronicle. The peak was later renamed in honor of U.S. Army Private Roy Muncaster (1892–1918), 6th Battalion, 20th Engineer Regiment; a forest ranger for the Olympic National Forest, who drowned 5 February 1918, when the troop transport SS Tuscania was torpedoed and sunk in World War I. The Muncaster Mountain name was officially adopted in 1918 by the U.S. Board on Geographic Names.

The first ascent of this peak was made in 1941 by T. Nelson of the United States Geological Survey.

Climate

Based on the Köppen climate classification, Muncaster Mountain is located in the marine west coast climate zone of western North America. Most weather fronts originate in the Pacific Ocean, and travel northeast toward the Olympic Mountains. As fronts approach, they are forced upward by the peaks of the Olympic Range, causing them to drop their moisture in the form of rain or snowfall (Orographic lift). As a result, the Olympics experience high precipitation, especially during the winter months. During winter months, weather is usually cloudy, but due to high pressure systems over the Pacific Ocean that intensify during summer months, there is often little or no cloud cover during the summer. The months July through September offer the most favorable weather for viewing or climbing this peak.

Geology

The Olympic Mountains are composed of obducted clastic wedge material and oceanic crust, primarily Eocene sandstone, turbidite, and basaltic oceanic crust. The mountains were sculpted during the Pleistocene era by erosion and glaciers advancing and retreating multiple times.

See also

 Olympic Mountains
 Geology of the Pacific Northwest

References

External links
 
 Weather forecast: Muncaster Mountain
 Muncaster Mountain: Flickr photo
 Roy Muncaster photo

Olympic Mountains
Mountains of Washington (state)
Mountains of Jefferson County, Washington
Landforms of Olympic National Park
North American 1000 m summits